, abbreviated as MHFG, or simply called Mizuho, is a banking holding company headquartered in the Ōtemachi district of Chiyoda, Tokyo, Japan. The name "" literally means "abundant rice" in Japanese and "harvest" in the figurative sense. Upon its founding, it was the largest bank in the world by assets. It is considered a systemically important bank by the Financial Stability Board.

It holds assets in excess of $1.8 trillion US dollars through its control of Mizuho Bank and other operating subsidiaries. The company's combined holdings form the third largest financial services group in Japan. Its banking businesses rank third in Japan after Mitsubishi UFJ Financial Group and SMBC Group. It is the 15th largest banking institution in the world by total assets as of December 2018. It is the 90th largest company in the world according to Forbes rankings as of May 2017. It is listed on the Tokyo Stock Exchange—where it is a constituent of the Nikkei 225 and TOPIX Core30 indices—and in the New York Stock Exchange in the form of American depositary receipts.

Mizuho offers a range of financial services, including banking, securities, trust and asset management services, employing more than 59,000 people throughout 880 offices.

History 
Mizuho was established originally as Mizuho Holdings, Inc. by the merger of Dai-Ichi Kangyo Bank, Fuji Bank, and the Industrial Bank of Japan in 2000. The earliest history of the companies that formed the Mizuho group was Yasuda-ya, which was founded as a private company in 1864. Then in 1872 the Dai-Ichi Bank, Ltd. was established as the first bank in Japan to be established under the nation's newly minted National Bank Act of 1872. In 1897 the Nippon Kangyo Bank, Ltd. and the Industrial Bank of Japan, Limited were next established as governmental institutions. In 1912 Yasuda-ya was incorporated and renamed Yasuda Bank, in a process where Yasuda absorbed the assets and business of seventeen different Japanese banking institutions.

In 1948 Yasuda Bank was itself renamed the Fuji Bank, Limited. Over the coming years, Fuji Bank would serve as the major financier for post-war Japanese economic growth, working with other major banks as partners when it was at risk of over-extending its funds. In 1950 the Nippon Kangyo Bank and IBJ were re-privatized after serving as semi-public banks for decades, following a recommendation from the Supreme Commander of the Allied Powers General Douglas MacArthur and the United States during the post-World War II economic reforms. 
In 1971 the Dai-ichi Bank and the Nippon Kangyo Bank merged to form the Dai-Ichi Kangyo Bank, Limited. Mizuho itself was created from the remnants of these mergers, and in 1999 DKB, Fuji and IBJ announced an agreement to consolidate the three banks' operations. This resulted in the establishment of the holding company named Mizuho Holdings, Inc in the year 2000. Then in 2002 DKB, Fuji and IBJ were officially and legally combined into two banks, Mizuho Bank, Ltd. and Mizuho Corporate Bank, Ltd. Initially Mizuho traded under the ticker symbol MHHD on the London Stock Exchange.

The merger resulted in the world's first trillion-dollar bank, with its $1.2 trillion in assets, surpassing the next largest bank by about $480 billion. The move has been considered to have formed one of the first "mega-institutions" in the financial industry, beginning a trend in the industry of large-scale bank mergers referred to as the "consolidation movement" during the 2000s. Though while other mega-institutions were composed of one major player and several minor ones, Mizuho was composed of three relatively equal institutions in terms of their size and influence. It remained the largest mega-bank in the world until 2005.

The name "Mizuho" means "new, bountiful, and rich harvest of rice" in Japanese. The original structure saw the founding of the Mizuho Bank, focusing on individuals and SMEs, and the Mizuho Corporate Bank, which focuses on corporate entities. The initial strategy of the company was to expand its lending operations with individuals and SMEs, and begin to offer fee-based services including securitizations, merger and acquisitions support, security-based investment banking, and syndicated loans. At the time, Mizuho controlled about 50% of the syndicated loans market. Mizuho also launched one of the first Internet-based securities products in 2000.

In 2003, Mizuho Financial Group, Inc. took over the operations of Mizuho Holdings. On October 1, 2005, all subsidiaries of Mizuho Holdings were transferred to the direct control of Mizuho Financial Group. Mizuho Holdings, no longer a bank holding company, was then renamed Mizuho Financial Strategy, which now focuses on providing advisory services. Mizuho Financial Group was in turn listed on the New York Stock Exchange under the stock symbol MFG in 2006.

Mizuho, through its operations in New York, became involved in the subprime mortgage crisis and lost seven billion dollars on the sale of collateralized debt obligations backed by subprime mortgages. It is the Asian bank which suffered the most losses due to the crisis. In 2012 Mizuho Financial Group acquired 100% of the assets from the Brazilian bank Banco WestLB do Brasil S.A. In 2014 the company underwent a board of directors reform in order to streamline its corporate culture into a more of a single identity, although its original board founded in 2002 was consistent with Japanese banking protocols. In 2016 they opened their global transactions banking headquarters in Singapore, and have offices for this unit in China, Hong Kong, Tokyo, London, and New York City. That year they also began a partnership with Cognizant, to develop block-chain methods of securing the banks private records.

Senior leadership

Presidents and CEOs 

 Katsuyuki Sugita (2001–2002); co-CEO
 Terunobu Maeda (2002–2009)
 Takashi Tsukamoto (2009–2011)
 Yasuhiro Sato (2011–2018)
 Tatsufumi Sakai (2018–2022)
 Masahiro Kihara (since 2022)

Divisions 
Mizuho splits its business into four distinct divisions, on a global basis:

Retail Group 
Mizuho is active in retail banking with 515 branches and over 11,000 automated teller machines (ATMs). Mizuho Bank is the only bank, other than Japan Post Bank, to have branches in every prefecture in Japan.  It serves over 26 million Japanese households,  90,000 SME customers, 2500 corporations, and retail brokerage clients under the name Mizuho Investors Securities nationwide, with $114 billion in retail customer assets under its management as of 2016.

 Mizuho Bank
 Mizuho Capital

Global Corporate Group 
Mizuho predecessors, the Dai-Ichi Kangyo Bank (DKB), the Fuji Bank (Fuji) and the Industrial Bank of Japan (IBJ), had great control over many Japanese companies through keiretsu system. The three banks led the DKB Group, Fuyo Group and the IBJ Group respectively. The Fuyo Group traces its history as far back as the old Yasuda zaibatsu. Even now, seven out of ten companies listed on the Tokyo Stock Exchange have dealings with Mizuho.

 Mizuho Securities

Global wealth and asset management 
 Mizuho Trust & Banking
 Mizuho Private Wealth Management
 Asset Management One

Asset Management One manages a number of ETFs which are listed in Japan, but some of these ETFs are very illiquid because no market maker was appointed. For example, One ETF Gold (1683:JP) frequently trades at a discount of more than 10% to the NAV.

Strategy affiliates 
 Mizuho Financial Strategy, formerly Mizuho Holdings, Inc.
 Mizuho Research Institute
 Mizuho Information & Research Institute

Offices

Sponsorship 
Mizuho is a sponsor of the Tokyo International Marathon and the 2020 Olympic Games and 2020 Paralympic Games.

Notable employees 
 Yoichiro Esaki, member of the House of Representatives
 Rin Ishigaki, poet
 Hirotaka Ishihara, member of the House of Representatives, son of Shintaro Ishihara
 Zenkichi Kojima, mayor of Shizuoka, Shizuoka
 Takeaki Matsumoto, member of the House of Representatives
 Shoichi Nakagawa, Minister of Finance, Minister of State in charge of Financial Services (2008–2009)
 Kei Ogura, singer
 Stanley Praimnath, survivor of the destruction of the World Trade Center on September 11th, 2001
 Mitsu Shimojo, member of the House of Representatives
 Yukio Tomioka, member of the House of Councillors

Controversies 
In September 2013, a routine regulatory control unveiled that Mizuho enabled loans of up to $1.9 million to the Yakuza Japanese mafia. It also appeared that loans to the mob had been approved through its affiliate credit company Orient Corp. This scandal led to the resignation of the group's CEO Takashi Tsukamoto.

In December 2019, a report named Mizuho as the top private lender to coal developers between January 2017 and September 2019. In March 2020, Japanese NGO Kiko Network filed the first climate related shareholder resolution with a Japanese company proposing Mizuho align its investments with the goals of the Paris Agreement. As of April 2020, three Scandinavian pension funds with a combined $178 Billion AUM expressed their support for the resolution.

See also 

 Dai-Ichi Kangyo Bank
 Fuji Bank
 Industrial Bank of Japan
 List of banks in Japan

References

External links

 
 Mizuho Financial Group Inc. by Google Finance
 Mizuho Watch by Inner City Press

 
Banks of Japan
Conglomerate companies based in Tokyo
Holding companies based in Tokyo
Multinational companies headquartered in Japan
Financial services companies based in Tokyo
Banks established in 2001
Companies listed on the New York Stock Exchange
Companies listed on the Osaka Exchange
Companies listed on the Tokyo Stock Exchange
Companies formerly listed on the London Stock Exchange
Fuyo Group
Systemically important financial institutions
Holding companies established in 2001